Benzbromarone is a uricosuric agent and non-competitive inhibitor of xanthine oxidase used in the treatment of gout, especially when allopurinol, a first-line treatment, fails or produces intolerable adverse effects. It is structurally related to the antiarrhythmic amiodarone.

Benzbromarone is highly effective and well tolerated, and clinical trials as early as 1981 and as recently as April 2008 have suggested it is superior to both allopurinol, a non-uricosuric xanthine oxidase inhibitor, and probenecid, another uricosuric drug.

Mechanism of action
Benzbromarone is a very potent inhibitor of CYP2C9. Several analogues of the drug have been developed as CYP2C9 and CYP2C19 inhibitors for use in research.

History
Benzbromarone was introduced in the 1970s and was viewed as having few associated serious adverse reactions. It was registered in about 20 countries throughout Europe, Asia and South America.

In 2003, the drug was withdrawn by Sanofi-Synthélabo, after reports of serious hepatotoxicity, although it is still marketed in several countries by other drug companies.

References 

Antigout agents
Diarylketones
Bromoarenes
Xanthine oxidase inhibitors
Vinylogous carboxylic acids